Mary Ann in Autumn (2010) is the eighth and penultimate book in the Tales of the City series by San Francisco novelist Armistead Maupin. It was released on November 2, 2010. It is the third book in the series to be written as a novel rather than first print as a serial.

Premise
Mary Ann Singleton, now in her late fifties, returns from New York City with a reason to seek support and a secret that she needs to share with Michael 'Mouse' Tolliver.

Plot summary 
Mary Ann Singleton Carruthers flees her luxurious life in Darien, Connecticut for San Francisco, seeking solace from old friend Michael Tolliver. Reeling from both ill health and her husband's infidelity, she asks Michael if she can stay in his guest cottage while she recuperates.

Meanwhile, other former Barbary Lane residents show up in the novel: Mary Ann's adoptive daughter Shawna is a popular sex blogger and is dating Otto, a clown; Anna Madrigal has mostly recovered from the stroke she had in Michael Tolliver Lives; Michael's assistant, Jake Greenleaf, wrestles with his attraction to a closeted Mormon missionary who is involved in the movement to "cure" homosexuals; and Jake, a trans man, despairs of ever saving enough money to pay for surgery. Ironically, his dream of having a hysterectomy is the same nightmare that Mary Ann is facing.

As the novel progresses, Dede and D'Orothea show up to help Mary Ann with her recuperation, Shawna befriends a homeless junkie prostitute, Jake makes a startling discovery, and a threat from the past comes back to haunt the former Barbary Lane residents.

References

External links
Mary Ann in Autumn at ArmisteadMaupin.com
"Back to the City" by The New York Times Sunday Book Review
"As his characters reach middle age, Armistead Maupin has got his mojo back." The Guardian.

2010 American novels
2010 LGBT-related literary works
2010s LGBT novels
Novels by Armistead Maupin
Tales of the City
Novels with transgender themes
HarperCollins books